Kairos is the ancient Greek concept of a propitious time for action.

Kairos may also refer to:

Organizations
 Kairos (company), American company
 KAIROS: Canadian Ecumenical Justice Initiatives, a coalition which united ten former social justice coalitions, based in Toronto
 Kairos Prison Ministry, an interdenominational Christian ministry

Other
 Kairos, a series of books by Madeleine L'Engle, beginning with A Wrinkle in Time (1962)
 Kairos, a 2021 novel by Jenny Erpenbeck
 Kairos (record label), an Austrian record label specialising in contemporary music
 KAIROS Prize, a cultural prize awarded by the Alfred Toepfer Stiftung F.V.S.
 Kairos (album), a 2011 album by the heavy metal band Sepultura
 Kairos (EP), a 2002 EP released by This Day Forward
 Kairos (TV series), a 2020 South Korean television series
 Kairos Document, a theological document against Apartheid in South Africa
 Kairos Palestine, an organization involved with the Kairos Palestine document
 Kairos (journal), a scholarly journal about computers and writing
 Kairos, a fictional planet, setting of episode "The Harvest of Kairos" (1980) from series 3 of Blake's 7